XHH-FM (100.7 MHz) is a Regional Mexican radio station serving the border towns of Ciudad Juárez, Chihuahua, Mexico (its city of license) and El Paso, Texas, United States (where it also maintains a sales office). It is owned by MegaRadio Mexico. The station is known on-air as Magia Digital 100.7.

XHH-FM broadcasts in HD.

History
The station received its concession in 1968 to operate on 93.3 MHz, but it soon moved to its present frequency.

References

External links
official website

Radio stations in Chihuahua
Mass media in Ciudad Juárez